Susan P. Holmes is a statistician and professor at Stanford University. She is noted for her work in applying nonparametric multivariate statistics, bootstrapping methods, and data visualization to biology. She received her PhD in 1985 from Université Montpellier II. She served as a tenured research scientist at INRA for ten years. She then taught at MIT and Harvard and was an associate professor of biometry at Cornell before moving to Stanford in 1998. She is married to fellow Stanford professor Persi Diaconis.

She is a Fellow of the Institute of Mathematical Statistics.

References

Living people
Biostatisticians
University of Montpellier alumni
Stanford University Department of Statistics faculty
Massachusetts Institute of Technology staff
Harvard University staff
Cornell University faculty
Fellows of the Institute of Mathematical Statistics
Women statisticians
Year of birth missing (living people)

American statisticians
Mathematical statisticians